Born Rich (Traditional Chinese: 富貴門, literally Gate of Wealth) is a 2009 Hong Kong television drama produced by TVB under executive producer Chong Wai-kin. The drama was promoted as TVB's "grand production" for 2009. Running for 39 episodes, the last two episodes were of two hours each.

Synopsis
Sophisticated banker Marcus Cheuk mistakes con artist Sha Fu-loi for his half brother Cheuk Yatming, fortuitously elevating the swindler to one of the leading figures in the banking industry. The lost and found brotherhood has blinded Marcus to Fu-loi's real nature and intentions.

Marcus is kidnapped overseas by a group of rioters. He undergoes a dramatic personality change after the incident. His wife Connie has tried her best to console him but still cannot help him get over the unpleasant experience. Longing for more comfort and support, Marcus gets back with his ex-lover Angie. Connie is heartbroken to learn about the affair and it has left the broken mirror that can't be mended.

The identity of Cheuk Yatming gives Fu-loi not only a sense of family warmth but also a sweet taste of romance. He finds himself in love with Marcus's younger sister Rene. Rene is also attracted to Fu-loi, but thinking that they are true biological siblings, she decides to keep her love under wraps and stays with her longtime admirer Topman instead. Later on, Yatming kisses her and, thinking that her brother loves her in the wrong way, goes to Sabah to try forget about Yatming.Topman follows her there and they fall back in love after Topman finds the ring she throws into the ocean.  This comes as a huge blow to Fu-loi. He is not willing to lose his love, but neither can he reveal his real identity. Caught up in the dilemma between love and money, Fu-loi finally chooses the fortune road of no return.

It is all about a tough battle for money, a devious triangle of love, and a severe challenge to ethics.

In the end the Sha brothers return to Sabah. From the suicide attempt Fu-loi loses his memory and recollection of his swindling past. Brother Po-loi eventually opens a pastry shop with Yan Dai. While failing to find the fortune, the Sha brothers return to a simpler and happier life in Sabah.

Reception
Although the series, along with Beyond the Realm of Conscience, were both heavily promoted as TVB's annual grand production, the series' ratings fell flat, when compared with its counterpart. While Beyond the Realm of Conscience regularly drew viewing shares of over 90%, Born Rich only drew viewing shares of around 80%, with only the final two weeks of episodes drawing over 90% viewing shares.

In addition, some members of the cast, most notably Ray Lui, have come out and criticized the series' plot as "poor", even after the cast offered suggestions to the scriptwriters on how to improve it.

Major characters

Cheuk family

First generation
Cheuk Song-hei (Traditional Chinese: 卓崇禧, portrayed by Lau Kong): The founder and first CEO of CosmoBank. A year and a half before the timeline of the series begins, Song-hei went to Sabah, Malaysia, and was not heard from since. A search effort bankrolled by the Cheuk family begin, and in Episode 6, it is discovered that Song-hei has died.
Musa "Mu Jie" Sheung (常開眉, portrayed by Nancy Sit): Widow of Cheuk Song-hei. She was an actress before her marriage to Song-hei.
Lau Fung-king (劉鳳瓊, portrayed by Natalie Tong): Mistress of Cheuk Song-hei, and has a son with him. She only appears in flashbacks.

Second generation
Marcus Cheuk (卓一元, portrayed by Ray Lui): Son of Cheuk Song-hei. He is the acting CEO of CosmoBank during Cheuk Song-hei's disappearance, and later succeeds his late father as CEO of the bank.
Connie Ho (賀爵年, portrayed by Jaime Chik): Wife of Marcus. She is a housewife for many years, until her divorce with Marcus, when she returns to work as the head of a PR firm.
Cheuk Yat-ming (卓一鳴): Illegitimate son of Cheuk Song-hei. He lived in Malaysia for all of his short life. His identity was stolen by his former neighbour Sha Fu-loi, who is a professional swindler.
Rene Cheuk (卓一心, portrayed by Anita Yuen): Daughter of Cheuk Song-hei and head of the Communications Department of CosmoBank.
"Topman" Ko Tok-man (高拓民, portrayed by Joe Ma): Rene's husband and COO of CosmoBank.

Third generation
Cheuk Chi-kei (卓子琦, portrayed by Elkie Chong): Daughter of Marcus and Connie.
Cheuk Chi-wai (卓子維, portrayed by Coleman Tam): Son of Marcus and Connie.

Others
Wong Lai-shui (王麗水, portrayed by Fung So-bor): The Cheuk family maid.

Tung family

First generation
Tung Tian-juk (董天祝, portrayed by Lau Siu-ming): Commonly referred to as Juk Sir (祝Sir), he had a long and very friendly relationship with Song-hei and is the Vice-Chairman of the CosmoBank Board. He had a hand in putting together Marcus with his (later) wife, Connie.

Second generation
Angie Tung (董令姿, portrayed by Kenix Kwok): A barrister, she is later retained as the legal consultant of the Cheuk family. She has an affair with Marcus, which ended Marcus's marriage with Connie Ho. Angie dies in car accident.

Sha family
Sha Fu-loi (沙富來, portrayed by Gallen Lo): A professional swindler, he steals the late Cheuk Yat-ming's identity in order to garner the vast wealth of the Cheuk family. Using his stolen identity, he is later able to become the Deputy CEO of CosmoBank. He also has a crush on Rene, who is engaged to Topman.
Sha Po-loi (沙寶來, portrayed by Kenneth Ma): Younger brother of Fu-loi, he is able to work on CosmoBank's General Services Department as a low-level worker.

Dai family

First generation
Dai Wing-luk (戴永祿, portrayed by Benz Hui): He is the General Manager of CosmoBank, and is often called the "Grand Manager of General Affairs" (大總管).
Eva Pao (鮑笑雁, portrayed by Angelina Lo: Wife of Wing-luk and fraternal sister of Musa Sheung.

Second generation
Yan Dai (戴亦欣, portrayed by Sharon Chan): A Supervisor of the Personal Finance Division of CosmoBank. She falls in love with Fu-loi.

CosmoBank workers

Board of directors
Ma Cheung Wai-kiu (馬蔣卉翹, portrayed by Lily Leung)
Man O-kwan (文傲君, portrayed by Yu Tze-ming)
Lai Kay-pui (賴紀培, portrayed by Kwong Chor-fai)
Lee Wai-shun(李唯信, portrayed by Kong Hon)

Other workers
Herman Lai (黎允才, portrayed by Lee Shing-Cheung): CFO of CosmoBank.
Szeto Fung (司徒豐, portrayed by Vincent Wong): Yan's boyfriend and a Personal Banking manager at CosmoBank.

Awards nominations
TVB Anniversary Awards (2009)
Best Drama
Best Actor (Ray Lui)
Best Actor (Gallen Lo)
Best Actress (Anita Yuen)
Best Actress (Jaime Chik)
Best Actress (Kenix Kwok)
My Favourite Male Character (Ray Lui)
My Favourite Male Character (Gallen Lo)
My Favourite Female Character (Anita Yuen)
My Favourite Female Character (Jaime Chik)
My Favourite Female Character (Kenix Kwok)
Best Supporting Actor (Kenneth Ma)Top 5
Most Improved Female Artiste (Sharon Chan)Top 5

Viewership Ratings

References

External links
TVB.com Born Rich - Official Website 
K for TVB Born Rich - Episode Summaries & Screencaptures

TVB dramas
2009 Hong Kong television series debuts
2009 Hong Kong television series endings
2000s Hong Kong television series
Serial drama television series